Trevor Atkinson (23 November 1942 – 31 October 1992) was an English professional footballer who played as a wing half. He made over 200 appearances in the Football League for Darlington and Bradford Park Avenue.

References

1942 births
1992 deaths
Sportspeople from Bishop Auckland
Footballers from County Durham
English footballers
Association football wing halves
Spennymoor United F.C. players
Darlington F.C. players
Bradford (Park Avenue) A.F.C. players
English Football League players